Painganadu Venkataraman Gopalan (1911 – February 1998) was an Indian career civil servant, a member of Central Secretariat Service who served as Director of Relief Measures and Refugees in the government of Zambia, especially the exodus of refugees from Southern Rhodesia (now Zimbabwe). While in Zambia, he later served as Advisor to 1st President of Zambia Kenneth Kaunda. He served as Joint Secretary to the Government of India in 1960s. He is the grandfather of U.S. Vice President Kamala Harris.

Gopalan was a member of the Imperial Secretariat Service and later a Central Secretariat Service officer.

Early life

Gopalan was born into a Brahmin family in 1911 in India.

Career 
Gopalan joined the Imperial Secretariat Service during British rule in India and later merged into Central Secretariat Service. He served as Under Secretary to the government of India in the Ministry of Transport (Roads Wing). In the 1950s, he was posted as a senior commercial officer in Bombay. He worked on the rehabilitation of refugees from East Pakistan in India.

Rising through the ranks, Gopalan was later empanelled and served as Joint Secretary to Government of India in the Ministry of Labour, Employment and Rehabilitation. He was later deputed to the government of Zambia and lived in Lusaka as Director of Relief Measures and Refugees, to help Zambia manage an influx of refugees from Southern Rhodesia (now Zimbabwe).

Personal life
P. V. Gopalan was married to Rajam Gopalan. They had four children: the oldest, a daughter, Shyamala, who earned a PhD in endocrinology at the University of California, Berkeley, and went on to have an academic and research career in the US and Canada; a son, Balachandran, who received a PhD in economics and computer science from the University of Wisconsin-Madison and returned to an academic career in India; a daughter, Sarala, an obstetrician who practised in Chennai; and the youngest, another daughter, Mahalakshmi, an information scientist, who worked for the Government of Ontario, Canada.  Gopalan was the grandfather of lawyer Maya Harris, U.S. Vice President Kamala Harris, and academic Sharada Balachandran Orihuela. Shyamala and her daughters used to visit Gopalan every few years, and Kamala has said that she was strongly influenced by his progressive political views on democracy and women's rights, especially their right to education. He later bought an apartment in Besant Nagar and lived in Chennai until his death.

Further reading
 The Truths We Hold: An American Journey (Publisher: Random House)
 Kamala Harris: Phenomenal Woman (Publisher: HarperCollins)

References

External links

 "The progressive Indian grandfather who inspired Kamala Harris". Los Angeles Times
 "How Berkeley’s busing program changed Kamala Harris’ life – and the presidential race" (Archived). The Mercury News
 "India’s Independence Movement source of inspiration for Indian-American politicians and activists" (Archived). News India Times

1911 births
1998 deaths
Indian civil servants
Indian government officials
Indian Tamil people
Tamil Brahmins
Central Secretariat Service officers
Harris family
People from Tiruvarur district
Experts on refugees
Indian expatriates in Zambia
People from Tamil Nadu